Willy Klopfenstein (11 January 1921 – 21 June 2002) was a Swiss ski jumper. He competed in the individual event at the 1948 Winter Olympics.

References

External links
 

1921 births
2002 deaths
Swiss male ski jumpers
Olympic ski jumpers of Switzerland
Ski jumpers at the 1948 Winter Olympics
Sportspeople from Thurgau